Mullagh is a village in County Clare, Ireland. It lies not far from the Atlantic coast, some 5 km southeast of Quilty and 6.5 km south-southeast of Spanish Point. Nearby towns include Milltown Malbay (7 km to the north) and Kilrush (22 km to the south).

Parish
The village of Mullagh is the centre of the parish of Kilmurry Ibrickane in the Roman Catholic Diocese of Killaloe. The local church is named St. Mary's.

Amenities
Mullagh National School, located at the top of Mullagh hill, has undergone much enlargement and many changes over the years, its latest extension having been officially opened on 23 June 2008.

Sport
The local Gaelic football team is Kilmurry Ibrickane GAA, playing in Quilty, but with their training complex in Mullagh. The club were winners of the Munster football final in 2004 and 2009 and of the county final in 2008 and 2009, 2004, 2002, 1993, 1966, 1963 and 1933.

Notable people
 Marty Morrissey - RTÉ commentator and presenter
 Odhran O'Dwyer  - International rules football player
 Thomas Kelly-Kenny - British Army general
 P.J. Murrihy - singer-songwriter

See also
 List of towns and villages in Ireland

References

Towns and villages in County Clare